The Chicago Shamrock Shuffle is an 8 kilometer road race held in Chicago which was started in 1980. The race is held during celebrations of Saint Patrick's Day in the Chicago area.

History 
For the first couple of decades, the number of participants and competitiveness of the field grew each year. In its inaugural year, the race attracted around 1000 participants. By 1992, the race had grown to nearly 7,500 participants. By 2007, the race had attracted over 30,000 runners. The number of participants is capped at 32,500.

In 1993, the race began offering prize money to the top finishers. They offered a purse of $2,000 the first year. In 2010, the prize purse had grown to $14,500, offering $2,500, $2000, $1500, $1000, and $500 to the first 5 male and female finishers.

In 2011 the race introduced a USATF team scoring championship. This scoring is coincident with the actual race. Scoring works similarly to cross country team scoring and is scored to 4 runners for both men's and women's teams.

From the races inauguration to 1992, there was no presenting sponsor. From 1993 to 1996, Sportmart was the main sponsor. From 1997 to 2007, LaSalle Bank was the main sponsor. Since 2008, Bank of America has been the presenting sponsor

Results 
Key:

References 

Recurring sporting events established in 1980